Alvinnn!!! and the Chipmunks is a 2015 animated television series featuring The Chipmunks, produced by Bagdasarian Productions in association with Technicolor Animation Productions. It is an update to the 1983 animated show of the same name. So far, five seasons have aired.

Series overview

Episodes

Season 1 (2015–16)

Season 2 (2016–17)

Season 3 (2017–19)

Season 4 (2019–21)

Season 5 (2021–23)

References

Episodes 2015
Lists of American children's animated television series episodes
Lists of French animated television series episodes
Lists of Nickelodeon television series episodes